Kabwata is a constituency of the National Assembly of Zambia. It covers the Lusaka suburbs of Kabwata, Libala and Chilenje in Lusaka District of Lusaka Province.

In September 2001, a by-election was held after incumbent MP Godfrey Miyanda was expelled from the ruling Movement for Multi-Party Democracy (MMD) together with nine cabinet ministers. The by-election was contested by the MMD (who fielded Dominic Laban Nyirongo), the United National Independence Party (who fielded Kamoyo Mwale) and the Forum for Democracy and Development (who fielded Richard Kachingwe). The by-election was won by Kachingwe, although he was only a Member of Parliament for a few months as general elections were held on 27 December 2001.

List of MPs

Election results

2001

2006

2011

References

Constituencies of the National Assembly of Zambia
1973 establishments in Zambia
Constituencies established in 1973